Juan-Carlos Rozas Salgado (born 5 May 1963) is a Spanish former professional racing cyclist. He rode in the 1986 Tour de France.

References

External links
 

1963 births
Living people
Spanish male cyclists
Sportspeople from Valladolid
Cyclists from Castile and León